Dallithyris is a genus of brachiopods belonging to the family Terebratulidae.

The genus has almost cosmopolitan distribution.

Species:

Dallithyris augustata 
Dallithyris cernica 
Dallithyris dubia 
Dallithyris elongata 
Dallithyris fulva 
Dallithyris globosa 
Dallithyris lata 
Dallithyris murrayi 
Dallithyris nitens 
Dallithyris oregonae 
Dallithyris pacifica 
Dallithyris parva 
Dallithyris sphenoidea 
Dallithyris sternsi 
Dallithyris tahitiensis

References

Brachiopod genera